James Frederick Brailsford MD, FRCP (8 July 1888 – 28 January 1961) was a British radiologist, known as the founder and first president of the British Association of Radiologists and as the co-discoverer of the Morquio (or Morquio-Brailsford) syndrome.

He studied with Sir John Robertson, the Medical Officer of Health of Birmingham. In 1923 Brailsford qualified MB, ChB (Birmingham) and was appointed assistant radiologist to Queen's Hospital, Birmingham. In 1928 he received the higher qualification MD (Birmingham). As a radiologist and a demonstrator in living anatomy, he published in 1934 his famous textbook The Radiology of Joints and Bones and thereby was acknowledged as one of the world's authorities on skeletal diseases. He received PhD Birmingham (1936) and became MRCS, LRCP (1923), MRCP (1935), and FRCP (1941).

Awards and honours
1927 — Robert Jones gold medal of the British Orthopaedic Association
1931 — Roentgen prize of the British Institute of Radiology
1934–1935 — Hunterian Professor of the Royal College of Surgeons of England
1944 — Mackenzie Davidson Lecturer
1943–1945 — Hunterian Professor of the Royal College of Surgeons of England

References

1888 births
1961 deaths
British radiologists
Fellows of the Royal College of Physicians